Harry Epworth Allen (27 November 1894 – 25 March 1958) was an English painter.  He was one of the twentieth century's most distinctive interpreters of landscape.

Early life
H. E. Allen was born at 36, William Street, in the Broomhall district of Sheffield, England. The city would remain his home for the rest of his life. His father was Henry Allen, a steel mark maker, and his mother, Elizabeth Epworth Allen (née Blacktin). Epworth was the maiden name of Elizabeth's mother, who was also called Elizabeth.

Allen showed remarkable artistic talent from an early age and, in 1902, won third prize for pen and ink drawing in an art studentship competition run by the Sheffield Weekly Independent. Between 1907 and 1911, he attended the King Edward VII School in Sheffield, where he obtained a Lower School Certificate Prize for his class distinctions in Arithmetic, Scripture and English.

In 1911, he began work as a clerk in the steel works owned by Arthur Balfour and in 1912 he enrolled at the Sheffield Technical School of Art.

War service
In 1915, Allen enlisted with the Royal Garrison Artillery of the Regular Army and in June 1916 was posted to the British Expeditionary Force to France. He worked as assistant to the observation officer, sketching enemy equipment and locations in the field. In August 1916, he was moved to the front line.

In 1917, he was awarded the Military Medal for conspicuous gallantry. He was badly wounded. His school magazine for 1917 recorded his experience:

One leg had to be amputated above the knee, while the other leg was seriously injured by shrapnel.

Artistic career

Allen was discharged from the Army in 1918. He was involved in a number of art societies in the 1920s and was a pupil of Frank Saltfleet.

He was a member of a number of art societies including Sheffield Society of Artists, Hallamshire Sketch Club (from 1932 known as the Hallamshire Art Society), Heeley Art Club, and later the Pastel Society 1952. He exhibited at The Royal Academy over 23 years from 1933 and he had 39 works accepted by them. He was prolific as an artist, working from the 1920s up until his death in 1958.

On 16 May 1925, he married Lucy Hodder at Holy Trinity Church, Millbrook, Southampton. They took their honeymoon at Corfe in Dorset. In 1931, Allen was made redundant and became a professional painter. After the death of Allen's father in 1932, the couple went to live with his mother, Elizabeth Epworth Blacktin. Allen died on 25 March 1958, at home, at 67 Banner Cross Road, from a coronary thrombosis.

Paintings
Allen was recognised as one of the Yorkshire Artists group. His style is often regarded as surreal.

Allen's paintings are held in the art collections of a number of British institutions including Sheffield Museums, Derby Art Gallery, The Hepworth Wakefield and the British Museum.

In April 2013, two of Allens' paintings, dating from 1942 and 1943, of scenes in Achill Island, County Mayo, were featured on BBC One's Antiques Roadshow. The works, which were executed in egg tempera, were valued at £6,000 – £7,000 each.

Selected works
 Burning Limestone, tempera on paper, 46.5 x 58.3 cm, Newport Museum and Art Gallery
 Keel Lake, Achill Island, oil on board, 35.5 x 51 cm, Mount Stewart, (National Trust)
 A Derbyshire Farmstead, tempera on paper, 36.5 x 50 cm, Potteries Museum & Art Gallery
 Derbyshire Walls, tempera on canvas, 47.5 x 58 cm, Museums Sheffield
 Eyam, Derbyshire, c.1936, pencil and tempera on paper, 35.2 x 51.2 cm, Laing Art Gallery
 Industrial Landscape, Hope Valley, Derbyshire, c.1959, tempera on paper, 63.1 x 76.7 cm, Derbyshire & Derby School Library Service
 Portrait of a Lady, 1936, tempera on panel, 51 x 40.8 cm, The Hepworth Wakefield
 Rocky Landscape, (nd) oil on plywood, 46.5 x 51 cm, Government Art Collection
 Sheepdog Trials, 1930s, tempera on canvas, 47 x 61 cm, Buxton Museum and Art Gallery
 Summer, 1940, tempera on canvas, 50.4 x 60.8 cm, Glynn Vivian Art Gallery
 The Caravan, tempera on board, 36.5 x 50 cm, Homerton College, Cambridge
 The Derelict Farm, 1949, tempera on board, 48.3 x 59.7 cm, Harris Museum
 The Road to the Hills, tempera on board, 45.7 x 61 cm, Derby Museum and Art Gallery

See also
 Vernon Hill
 Grant Wood
 Paul Nash
 Stanley Spencer

References

Sources 
 Basford, J., Harry Epworth Allen (1894–1958): Catalogue of His Works (2007), The Horizon Press and Derwent-Wye,

External links
 
 The Derbyshire of Harry Epworth Allen (1894–1958) at artinconnu.com

1894 births
1958 deaths
20th-century English painters
English male painters
Artists from Sheffield
People educated at King Edward VII School, Sheffield
20th-century English male artists